Valérie Donzelli (born 2 March 1973) is a French actress, filmmaker and screenwriter. She has directed five feature films and two short films since 2008, including the film Declaration of War (2011).

Early life
Valérie Donzelli was born in Épinal (France). She grew up in Créteil, near Paris. She moved to Lille with her family when she was 14 years old before going back to Paris at the age of 19. Before starting to work in the cinema, Donzelli first studied architecture, but abandoned it quickly. She started playing theatre at the municipal conservatory of the 10th arrondissement of Paris, but always kept a bad memory of this period. For a living, she worked at a bakery in Paris. She met Jérémie Elkaïm at that time, who became her partner, both in life and at work, and who encouraged her to quit the conservatory and her job at the bakery to become an actress. They now have two kids; the oldest one, Gabriel, inspired the movie Declaration of War.  They are now separated, but still have a close relationship.

Career
In 2001, Valérie Donzelli was the leading actress in Martha Martha, by Sandrine Veysset, which was presented at Directors' Fortnight, Le Plus Beau Jour de ma vie, and also Entre ses mains. She achieved great success among French public thanks to the French TV show Clara Sheller (2005), in which she plays Jeanne, best friend of the main character. 
Donzelli's first film, The Queen of Hearts, in which she was the leading actress, was more successful than expected. Jérémie Elkaïm is also co-writer. The film was presented at Locarno International Film Festival. Despite its low budget, the film can be considered a success because of its 30,000 spectators.  
   
In 2011, with the help of her now ex-partner Jérémie Elkaïm, Valérie Donzelli directed her second full-length feature film, Declaration of War. This movie, presented during the 2011 Cannes Festival, achieved great success, both with the public and critics, in France. It is directly inspired by their private life, relating how their couple fought against their son's cancer when he was 18 months. As Tim Palmer notes, "Declaration of War serves as an emblematic, even quintessential, contemporary French production: a barometer to gauge film industry standards and prevailing French cultural taste, a standard-bearer of ostensibly progressive materials, an ambassador text for French screen values." The movie was selected for the Academy Award for Best Foreign Language Film in 2012, but was not part of the final list.

Donzelli directed once again Jérémie Elkaïm in Main dans la main (2012), with also Valérie Lemercier in the leading role.

Donzelli considers that this is always a politic and engaged gesture to make films as women, and admires Agnès Varda for her work and her status of first women filmmaker into French Cinema.

Valérie Donzelli is part of the jury during Locarno International Film Festival in 2013. She presents Que d'Amour!, a TV adaptation from the play The Game of Love and Chance (Le Jeu de l'Amour et du Hasard), by Marivaux, with Comédie-Française' sociétaires.

Her 2015 film Marguerite & Julien was selected to compete for the Palme d'Or at the 2015 Cannes Film Festival. She was named as the President of the Jury of the International Critics' Week section of the 2016 Cannes Film Festival.

Filmography

Actress

Features
2001: Martha Martha by Sandrine Veysset: Martha 
2001: Les Âmes câlines by Thomas Bardinet: Émilie 
2003: That Woman by Guillaume Nicloux: Claire Atken 
2003: Who Killed Bambi? by Gilles Marchand: Nathalie 
2005: Mystification ou l'histoire des portraits by Sandrine Rinaldi: Emilie 
2005: Le Plus Beau Jour de ma vie by Julie Lipinski: Éléonore 
2005: Entre ses mains by Anne Fontaine: Valérie 
2005: Voici venu le temps by Alain Guiraudie: Soniéra Noubi-Datch 
2006: L'Intouchable by Benoît Jacquot: theatre actress 
2006: L'Homme qui rêvait d'un enfant by Delphine Gleize: Suzanne 
2007: Il fait beau dans la plus belle ville du monde by Valérie Donzelli 
2007: 7 ans by Jean-Pascal Hattu : Maïté 
2009: The Queen of Hearts by Valérie Donzelli: Adèle 
2011: Declaration of War by Valérie Donzelli: Juliette 
2011: Belleville Tokyo by Élise Girard: Marie Tourelle 
2011: Iris in Bloom by Valérie Mréjen and Bertrand Schefer 
2011: Pourquoi tu pleures? by Katia Lewkowicz: Anna 
2011: L'Art de séduire by Guy Mazarguil: Estelle 
2013: The Big Bad Wolf by Nicolas Charlet and Bruno Lavaine 
2013: Les Grandes Ondes (à l'ouest) by Lionel Baier : Julie 
2013: Opium by Arielle Dombasle : Valentine Hugo 
2014: Orage by Fabrice Camoin
2014: Saint Laurent by Bertrand Bonello : Renée
2015: The White Knights by Joachim Lafosse :  Françoise Dubois

Short films
1998: Herbert C. Berliner by Marc Gibaja
1999: Le Spectateur by Marc Gibaja : Cynthia
2000: Demoiselle by Valérie Donzelli : Adèle
2001: Confessions dans un bain by Marc Gibaja : Sophie
2001: Le Chien, le chat et le cibachrome by Didier Blasco
2003: Ni vue, ni connue by Dorothée Sebbagh : Alice
2003: Le Lion volatil by Agnès Varda : La cliente en pleurs
2004: Frédérique amoureuse by Pierre Lacan : Frédérique
2004: Le Nécrophile by Philippe Barassat : La prostituée
2005: On est mort un million de fois by Dorothée Sebbagh : Valentine
2006: Odile... by Bénédicte Delgéhier : Odile
2007: Abattoir by Didier Blasco : Judith
2007: Il fait beau dans la plus belle ville du monde by Valérie Donzelli : Adèle
2008: C'est pour quand? by Katia Lewkowicz : La jeune fille
2009: Juliette by Sylvie Ballyot : Juliette
2010: Madeleine et le facteur by Valérie Donzelli : Madeleine
2010: Manu by Jérémie Elkaïm : Julie
2012: Révolution by Nadia Jandeau

Television
1999: Dossier: disparus épisode Amanda by Frédéric Demont et Philippe Lefebvre: Amanda/Muriel
1999: Les Terres froides by Sébastien Lifshitz: Isabelle
2002: Sous mes yeux by Virginie Wagon: Alison
2003: Motus by Laurence Ferreira Barbosa: La stagiaire d'Antoine
2005: Le Cocon, débuts à l'hôpital by Pascale Dallet: Nathalie
2005: Clara Sheller by Renaud Bertrand: Jeanne
2006: Mentir un peu by Agnès Obadia: Blandine
2006: Passés troubles by Serge Meynard: Sophie Valatier
2007: Les Camarades by François Luciani (minisérie): Julie
2008: Sa raison d'être by Renaud Bertrand: Nathalie
2008: Mafiosa, le clan Saison 2 d'Eric Rochant: L'avocate
2009: La Belle vie by Virginie Wagon: Béa

Screenwriter
2000: Demoiselle
2007: Il fait beau dans la plus belle ville du monde
2009: The Queen of Hearts
2010: Madeleine et le facteur
2011: Declaration of War
2012: La Vie parisienne de Vincent Dietschy (originale idea)
2012: Main dans la main

Film director

Short films
2007: Il fait beau dans la plus belle ville du monde
2010: Madeleine et le facteur

Features
2009: The Queen of Hearts
2010: Declaration of War
2012: Main dans la main
2013: Que d'amour
2015: Marguerite & Julien

Television
2013: Que d'amour! Adaptation from The Game of Love and Chance, by Marivaux

Awards and nominations
2010: Public Prize at the Angers European First Film Festival for The Queen of Hearts
2011: Valois d’Or at Festival du film francophone d’Angoulême for ''Declaration of War]]
2012: Grand Prix at Cabourg Film Festival for Declaration of War
2012: Jury Prize, Public Prize, and Bloggers Prix at the Festival Paris Cinéma for '[[Declaration of War (film)|'Declaration of War
2012: Étoile d'or du meilleur scénario for Declaration of War  
Nomination for Best film for Declaration of War, Cesar Awards 2012  
Nomination for Best Director for Declaration of War, Cesar Awards 2012  
Nomination for Best Actress for Declaration of War, Cesar Awards 2012  
Nomination for Best Original Writing for Declaration of War, Cesar Awards 2012

References

Further reading
Valerie Donzelli se tourne vers la télévision pour son prochain film
"Un film dansé pour Valérie Donzelli", Cahiers du cinéma, no 670, septembre 2011, p. 62
La Guerre est déclarée [archive], sur jpbox-office.com (consulted March 16, 2014)

External links

Valérie Donzelli via Allociné

1973 births
20th-century French actresses
21st-century French actresses
French film actresses
French film directors
French television actresses
French women film directors
Living people
French people of Italian descent
People from Épinal
French women screenwriters
French screenwriters